is a Japanese anime storyboard artist and director who has mainly worked as a director with works from Seven Arcs and Diomedéa (from 2013 onwards).

Anime involved in
Petite Cossette (2004) – 3D Cinematography
Tsukuyomi -Moon Phase- (2004) – Storyboard, Episode Director, Opening Director
Magical Girl Lyrical Nanoha (2004) – Episode Director (eps 1,11/OP)
Magical Girl Lyrical Nanoha A's (2005) – Director, Storyboard (ep 1), Episode Director (ep 1)
Inukami! (2006) – Director
Magical Girl Lyrical Nanoha Strikers (2007) – Director
Inukami! The Movie (2007) – Director
Sekirei (2008) – Director
Asura Cryin' (2009) – Director
Asura Cryin' 2 (2009) – Director
Sekirei: Pure Engagement (2010) – Director
Dog Days (2011) – Director
Ro-Kyu-Bu! (2011) – Director
Campione! (2012) – Director
Problem Children Are Coming from Another World, Aren't They? (2013) – Chief Director
Ro-Kyu-Bu! SS (2013) – Chief Director
Day Break Illusion (2013) – Director
Riddle Story of Devil (2014) – Director
Kantai Collection (2015) – Director
Unlimited Fafnir (2015) – Chief Director
KanColle: The Movie (2016) – Director
Fuuka (2017) – Director
Aho-Girl (2017) – Chief Director
Action Heroine Cheer Fruits (2017) – Director
Happy Sugar Life (2018) – Chief Director
Ahiru no Sora (2019–2020) – Chief Director
Parallel World Pharmacy (2022) ー Director

References

External links

Anime directors
Living people
Year of birth missing (living people)